Patrick M. "Pat" Dolan is an American,  supervisor with the United Fire Protection Systems, and Democratic member of the St. Louis County Council.  He has represented the fifth district since 2011.

Early life and career 
Pat Dolan graduated from Christian Brothers College High School in 1973.  He is a supervisor with the United Fire Protection Systems.  He has been the Secretary/ Treasurer of the St. Louis City Labor Club, President of Sprinkler Fitters Local 268, and a backstopper.  He is married, has two kids, and attends the Little Flower Catholic Church in Richmond Heights.  He used to be on the parish council there.

Political career 
Pat Dolan was on the City of Richmond Heights Council for eight years.  He has been a St. Louis County Council since 2011.  He represents the 5th district which contains about 145,000 people in mid St. Louis County.

Committee assignments 
 Committee of the Whole
 Justice, Health, and Welfare
 Public Improvements

Electoral history

References

External links 
 Campaign Website
 Official Bio

Living people
Missouri Democrats
Politicians from St. Louis County, Missouri
Year of birth missing (living people)
Missouri city council members
County commissioners in Missouri